Mihăileni is a commune located in Sibiu County, Transylvania, Romania. It is composed of five villages: Metiș (Mártonfalva), Mihăileni, Moardăș (Mardos), Răvășel (Rovás) and Șalcău (Salkó). Metiș and Moardăș have fortified churches.

References

Communes in Sibiu County
Localities in Transylvania